Christel Rotthaus is a professor of mathematics at Michigan State University. She is known for her research in  commutative algebra.

Career
Rotthaus received her Ph.D. from Westfälische Wilhelms-Universität Münster in 1975 under Hans-Joachim Nastold. Rotthaus now works at Michigan State University.

Awards and honors

In 2012, Rotthaus became a fellow of the American Mathematical Society.

Selected publications
Brodmann, M.; Rotthaus, Ch.; Sharp, R. Y. On annihilators and associated primes of local cohomology modules. J. Pure Appl. Algebra 153 (2000), no. 3, 197–227. 
Heinzer, William; Rotthaus, Christel; Sally, Judith D. Formal fibers and birational extensions. Nagoya Math. J. 131 (1993), 1–38.
Rotthaus, Christel. On rings with low-dimensional formal fibres. J. Pure Appl. Algebra 71 (1991), no. 2–3, 287–296.
Rotthaus, Christel; Şega, Liana M. Some properties of graded local cohomology modules. J. Algebra 283 (2005), no. 1, 232–247.
Rotthaus, Christel. On the approximation property of excellent rings. Invent. Math. 88 (1987), no. 1, 39–63.

References

Living people
American women mathematicians
20th-century American mathematicians
21st-century American mathematicians
Fellows of the American Mathematical Society
20th-century women mathematicians
21st-century women mathematicians
Year of birth missing (living people)
20th-century American women
21st-century American women